Henry Grey, 1st Duke of Suffolk, 3rd Marquess of Dorset  (17 January 151723 February 1554), was an English courtier and nobleman of the Tudor period. He was the father of Lady Jane Grey, known as "the Nine Days' Queen".

Origins

He was born on 17 January 1517 at Westminster, London and was the son and heir of Thomas Grey, 2nd Marquess of Dorset (1477–1530) by his wife Margaret Wotton (1485–1535), daughter of Sir Robert Wotton (c. 1463–1524) of Boughton Malherbe in Kent. Through his father, he was a great-grandson of Elizabeth Woodville, the wife of King Edward IV, by her first marriage to Sir John Grey of Groby.

Marriage and progeny
Before 1530, Grey was betrothed to Catherine FitzAlan, the daughter of William FitzAlan, 18th Earl of Arundel, whom he later refused to marry.

In 1533, with the permission of King Henry VIII, he married his half-second cousin Lady Frances Brandon (1517–1559), the daughter of King Henry's sister Mary and  Charles Brandon, 1st Duke of Suffolk. They had three daughters: 
Lady Jane Grey (1537–1554) 
Lady Katherine Grey (1540–1568)
Lady Mary Grey (1545–1578)

Career

Henry VIII's reign
Henry Grey became the 3rd Marquess of Dorset in 1530 following the death of his father. Before Henry VIII's death in 1547, Grey became a fixture in court circles. A knight of the Bath, he was the king's sword-bearer at Anne Boleyn's coronation in 1533, at Anne of Cleves' arrival in 1540, and at the capture of Boulogne in 1545. Twice he bore the Cap of Maintenance in parliament. He helped lead the army in France in 1545. In 1547, he became a Knight of the Order of the Garter.

Edward VI's reign
After Henry VIII's death in 1547, Grey fell out of favour with the leader of King Edward VI's government, Edward Seymour, 1st Duke of Somerset and Lord Protector of England. Returning to his home in Bradgate, Leicestershire, Grey concentrated on raising his family to greater heights. Thus, with the Protector's brother Thomas, Lord Seymour, Grey conspired to have his daughter Jane married to the King. This plot failed, ending in Seymour's execution, but Grey emerged unscathed.

In 1549, John Dudley, Earl of Warwick, overthrew the Protectorship and secured power by appointing loyal friends to the Privy Council. Grey joined the Council as a part of this group. In July 1551 his wife's youngest half-brother, Charles Brandon, 3rd Duke of Suffolk, died. Henry Grey was created Duke of Suffolk jure uxoris on 11 October 1551, in the same ceremony that elevated John Dudley to the Dukedom of Northumberland.

Protestantism
Henry Grey was best known for his zeal for the Protestant faith. The Swiss reformer Heinrich Bullinger dedicated a book to him in 1551 and frequently corresponded with the family. In Parliament and on the Privy Council, Grey pushed for further Protestant reforms. He is credited with making Leicestershire one of the most reliably Protestant counties in early modern England.

Queen Jane
Seriously ill, and fearing his own death, King Edward VI granted Northumberland's request for the marriage of Suffolk's daughter Lady Jane Grey to Northumberland's son, Lord Guildford Dudley, on 25 May 1553. Edward later altered his will to make Jane his designated successor. Edward died on 6 July 1553, and three days later Suffolk, Northumberland, and other members of the Privy Council proclaimed Jane queen.

This proclamation failed; not by a large-scale rallying of forces in the country to Henry VIII's eldest daughter, the future Queen Mary I, as is often thought, but by a wavering Privy Council switching its allegiance to Mary during Northumberland's absence on the campaign against her. The decision was led by Henry Fitzalan, 12th Earl of Arundel, and William Herbert, 1st Earl of Pembroke. Arundel had been imprisoned earlier by Northumberland for having sided with the previous Protector, Somerset; but it is not clear why Pembroke revolted, especially since his son and heir, Henry Herbert, married Henry Grey's other daughter, Katherine, the same day as Jane's wedding. The country was divided in its loyalties to the two contenders for queen at the time.

By his wife's friendship with the new Queen Mary, Grey and his daughter and son-in-law temporarily avoided execution. However, Mary had Henry Grey beheaded on 23 February 1554, after his conviction for high treason for his part in Sir Thomas Wyatt's attempt (JanuaryFebruary 1554) to overthrow her after she announced her intention to marry King Philip II of Spain.

Mummified head

According to Walter George Bell (writing in 1920), in 1851 the severed head of the Duke of Suffolk was discovered in a vault in the Church of Holy Trinity, Minories, in the City of London, suggested to have been preserved by the tannin-rich oak sawdust used to pad the basket on the scaffold on which he had been beheaded 297 years earlier. Bell believed the head might have been hidden by the Duke's widow to prevent it from being exposed on a spike on London Bridge. Both of them had worshipped in the chapel at Holy Trinity. The church was closed in 1899 and deconsecrated, when the head found a new resting place at St Botolph's Church, Aldgate, to which Holy Trinity Parish had been annexed.

The head was examined in the late 19th century by Sir George Scharf, former Keeper of the National Portrait Gallery, who noted a strong resemblance between its features and those in the portrait of the duke then in the possession of the Marquess of Salisbury at Hatfield House. However, Bell also notes a scandal at Holy Trinity in 1786 in which a sexton had been found sawing and chopping up coffins in the vaults and using the wood to stoke the fire in his quarters. Many of the bodies had been partly dismembered in the process, and Bell warned his readers that the surviving head might well have resulted from this debacle.

In later years, the head was sealed in a vault in the crypt at St Botolph's, until a planned conversion of the space into an office resulted in an archaeological investigation of the site between April and July 1990. The archaeologists recovered the head from the vault and the Rector of the church buried it in the churchyard.

Family tree

Arms
	
The arms of the head of the Grey family are blazoned Barry of six argent and azure in chief three torteaux gules.

Notes

References
Robert C. Braddock, "Grey, Henry, duke of Suffolk (1517–1554)", Oxford Dictionary of National Biography, Oxford University Press, 2004, 
Eric Ives, "Lady Jane Grey, A Tudor Mystery", Wiley-Blackwell 2009,

|-

1517 births
1554 deaths
301
Knights of the Bath
Knights of the Garter
Lord High Constables of England
Lord-Lieutenants of Leicestershire
People executed under the Tudors for treason against England
Executed English people
Prisoners in the Tower of London
16th-century English nobility
Henry
Henry
People executed by Tudor England by decapitation
People executed under Mary I of England
English politicians convicted of crimes
Barons Harington
4
Barons Astley (1295)